The 1976 National League Championship Series was a postseason series between the two division champions of the National League in the Cincinnati Reds and the Philadelphia Phillies. This was the eighth NLCS held in baseball history. For the fourth time in seven seasons, the Reds won the best-of-five series to reach the World Series. They did so in a three game sweep, winning easily in the first two games before ending the series in their last at bat in Game 3.

Stars of the series for the Reds included batters Johnny Bench (4 for 12, HR), Dave Concepción (4 runs scored), George Foster (2 H, both home runs), Ken Griffey (5 for 13, triple), Pete Rose (6 for 14, 2 RBIs, 3 runs scored), and pitchers Don Gullett (win, 8 IP, 2 hits), Pedro Borbón ( IP, 0.00 ERA), and Pat Zachry (win, 5 IP, 3 SO).

Summary

Cincinnati Reds vs. Philadelphia Phillies

Game summaries

Game 1

Reds starter Don Gullett held the Phils to two hits in eight strong innings, but allowed them to score first when Dave Cash hit a leadoff double, moved to third on a groundout and scored on Mike Schmidt's sacrifice fly. Gullett then walked three to load the bases, but got Tim McCarver to fly out to end the inning. The Reds tied the game in the third on Tony Perez's sacrifice fly off of Steve Carlton, then took the lead in the sixth on George Foster's home run. After a double and error put two on, Gullett's RBI single made it 3–1 Reds. After allowing a leadoff double and walk in the eighth, Carlton was replaced by Tug McGraw, who allowed a one-out two-run double to Gullett and RBI double to Pete Rose. The Phillies attempted to rally in the ninth off of Rawly Eastwick. Garry Maddox hit a leadoff single and scored on Greg Luzinski's double. After Dick Allen singled, Jay Johnstone's RBI single made it 6–3 Reds, but Eastwick retired the next two batters to end the game and give the Reds a 1–0 series lead.

Game 2

Buoyed by an RBI single by Bob Boone in the second after two leadoff singles and a homer by Greg Luzinski in the fifth off of Pat Zachry, Phils starter Jim Lonborg no-hit the Reds until the sixth.  After giving up a leadoff walk, one-out RBI single to Pete Rose, followed by another single by Ken Griffey, Lonborg was removed from the game by manager Danny Ozark. Gene Garber came in relief and after an intentional walk loaded the bases, two runs came across on an error by first baseman Dick Allen on a ball hit by Tony Pérez, then George Foster's RBI groundout made it 4–2 Reds. They added to their lead next inning on Griffey's RBI single off of Tug McGraw and Perez's sacrifice fly off of Ron Reed. Pedro Borbon pitched the last four innings to close to give the Reds a 2–0 series lead heading home.

Game 3

Once again, the Phillies got a strong starting pitching performance that went for naught.  Jim Kaat held the Reds to one hit after six innings.  Meanwhile, his teammates provided him a 3–0 lead via a consecutive doubles in the fourth by Mike Schmidt and Greg Luzinski off of Gary Nolan and RBI doubles by Garry Maddox and Schmidt in the seventh after a leadoff walk off of Manny Sarmiento.

But in the bottom of the seventh, Kaat began to lose it.  Ken Griffey led off with a single, Joe Morgan walked. Ron Reed then replaced Kaat to face Tony Pérez, who promptly singled home Griffey. George Foster followed with a sacrifice fly.  After a walk to Johnny Bench, Reed retired Dave Concepción, but then surrendered a two-run triple to César Gerónimo to put the Reds ahead 4–3.

In the eighth, the Phillies rallied against Reds closer Rawly Eastwick. Jay Johnstone led off with a double and went to third on a wild pitch as Bob Boone walked.  Larry Bowa doubled in Johnstone and Dave Cash hit a sacrifice fly to give the Phillies the lead at 5–4.  The Phillies added another run in the top of the ninth on an RBI triple by Johnstone to make it 6–4.

With Reed still on the mound in the ninth, Foster and Bench hit back-to-back homers to tie the game.  Gene Garber relieved and promptly gave up a single to Concepción.  Tom Underwood came on to surrender a walk to Geronimo.  Pinch-hitter Ed Armbrister sacrificed the runners to second and third.  Underwood then intentionally walked Pete Rose to load the bases.  With the infield drawn in, Griffey hit a high bouncer toward Bobby Tolan playing first.  Tolan charged, but the ball got past him and Concepción scored to send the Reds to their second straight World Series; they would sweep the Yankees in four games, becoming the only team in the divisional era (to date) to go undefeated in the postseason.

Composite box
1976 NLCS (3–0): Cincinnati Reds over Philadelphia Phillies

References

External links
1976 NLCS at Baseball-Reference.com

National League Championship Series
National League Championship Series
Cincinnati Reds postseason
Philadelphia Phillies postseason
National League Championship Series
National League Championship Series
1970s in Cincinnati
1970s in Philadelphia
National League Championship Series
Baseball competitions in Cincinnati
Baseball competitions in Philadelphia